Paravaran Asseman is an Iranian aviation specialist.

Formed in 1974, Paravaran Asseman is an organisation located in Tehran, Iran. Paravaran Asseman is Iran’s paraglider producer.

In 2007 Paaviation Supplied a Britten Norman Islander aircraft, The first new western made aircraft  that has been purchased by the Iranian Government since the Islamic revolution of 1979.

Paravaran Asseman is the Dealer for Britten-Norman in Iran and the Middle East and a representative for Normarc Flight Inspection Systems. Paravaran Asseman is the exclusive Iran and Middle East representative of flying schools and has a flying club in Tehran that gives pilot training for PPL CPL Licenses in Iran and the Middle East.
Paravaran Asseman is the Iranian dealer and treatment specialist for aircraft anti-corrosion treatment ACF50

References

External links
 Official Paaviation website

Aircraft manufacturers of Iran
Glider aircraft
Transport companies established in 1974
Vehicle manufacturing companies established in 1974
1974 establishments in Iran
Manufacturing companies based in Tehran